La Hojilla (English: The Razorblade) is a Venezuelan television programme. It is transmitted daily on weekdays at 11pm on Venezolana de Televisión. It is hosted by Mario Silva and Jorge Amorín. It is also broadcast on Radio Nacional de Venezuela.

The Economist discussed Silva in 2011; Silva rejected the allegations. In February 2012, allegations aired on La Hojilla against opposition candidate Henrique Capriles Radonski gained international coverage. Capriles rejected the allegations.

In the acclaimed 2013 book "Comandante: Hugo Chávez's Venezuela", Rory Carrol writes:"[T]he comandante’s real passion blossomed later at night when he returned to the thatched-roof terrace and, fueled by fresh coffee shots, plowed through piles of documents, his pen circling, stabbing, underlining. At 11:00 p.m., he would turn up the volume of the television on a corner shelf to watch The Razorblade, a nightly chat show on the main state channel. The host, Mario Silva, a heavy, bearded man with a keen intelligence and lupine grin, wore red baseball caps and leather jackets. Seated at a desk surrounded by images of Che Guevara, Karl Marx, Bolívar, and Chávez, he interviewed occasional guests but mostly assailed the comandante’s foes in monologues of lip-smacking relish. He was famous for showing photographs that embarrassed the opposition. Silva also played excerpts of intercepted phone calls revealing, or purportedly revealing, opponents’ sleaze and hypocrisy. Some were edited to the accompaniment of farm animal noises. The host said the material came from anonymous sources, which everyone assumed to be the Directorate for Intelligence and Prevention Services, DISIP, the main intelligence agency. It was the comandante’s favorite show, and he urged followers to watch it. Some nights he phoned in for on-air banter with Silva, or to make policy announcements."

References

External links 
 Official site
 Page on VTV website
 Official Twitter feed

Venezolana de Televisión original programming
Venezuelan propaganda organizations